The Evil Empire of Everything is the twelfth studio album by hip hop group Public Enemy, released on October 1, 2012.  The album was released on Enemy Records, distributed by Spit Digital, and originally was exclusively available on iTunes.  The album was released as a CD on November 6, 2012, along with the album Most of My Heroes Still Don't Appear on No Stamp, which, Chuck D, described as a "fraternal twin" to The Evil Empire of Everything. The album received positive reviews from critics.

A vinyl edition was made available on April 19, 2014 to commemorate Record Store Day. The two LP set, limited to 500 copies, included a 2014 anniversary calendar "25 Years of Public Enemy".

Track listing

References

2012 albums
Public Enemy (band) albums